Shawn Brown, Sean Brown, Shaun Brown, Sean Browne may refer to:

 Shawn Brown (soccer), a Jamaican-Canadian soccer player
 Seán Browne (1916–1996), Irish politician
 Sean K. L. Browne (born 1953), American sculptor
 Shawn Brown, a vocalist in the bands Dag Nasty and Swiz
Shaun Brown (business), former managing director of the Special Broadcasting Service
Shaun Brown (actor), an American actor
Sean Brown (ice hockey), a Canadian former ice hockey player